A reference genome (also known as a reference assembly) is a digital nucleic acid sequence database, assembled by scientists as a representative example of the set of genes in one idealized  individual organism of a species.  As they are assembled from the sequencing of DNA from a number of individual donors, reference genomes do not accurately represent the set of genes of any single individual organism.  Instead a reference provides a haploid mosaic of different DNA sequences from each donor. For example, the most recent human reference genome (assembly GRCh38/hg38) is derived from >60 genomic clone libraries. There are reference genomes for multiple species of viruses, bacteria, fungus, plants, and animals. Reference genomes are typically used as a guide on which new genomes are built, enabling them to be assembled much more quickly and cheaply than the initial Human Genome Project. Reference genomes can be accessed online at several locations, using dedicated browsers such as Ensembl or UCSC Genome Browser.

Properties of reference genomes

Measures of length 
The length of a genome can be measured in multiple different ways.

A simple way to measure genome length is to count the number of base pairs in the assembly.

The golden path is an alternative measure of length that omits redundant regions such as haplotypes and pseudoautosomal regions. It is usually constructed by layering sequencing information over a physical map to combine scaffold information. It is a 'best estimate' of what the genome will look like and typically includes gaps, making it longer than the typical base pair assembly.

Contigs and scaffolds 

Reference genomes assembly requires reads overlapping, creating contigs, which are contiguous DNA regions of consensus sequences. If there are gaps between contigs, these can be filled by scaffolding, either by contigs amplification with PCR and sequencing or by Bacterial Artificial Chromosome (BAC) cloning. Filling these gaps is not always possible, in this case multiple scaffolds are created in a reference assembly. Scaffolds are classified in 3 types: 1) Placed, whose chromosome, genomic coordinates and orientations are known; 2) Unlocalised, when only the chromosome is known but not the coordinates or orientation; 3) Unplaced, whose chromosome is not known.

The number of contigs and scaffolds, as well as their average lengths are relevant parameters, among many others, for a reference genome assembly quality assessment since they provide information about the continuity of the final mapping from the original genome. The smaller the number of scaffolds per chromosome, until a single scaffold occupies an entire chromosome, the greater the continuity of the genome assembly. Other related parameters are N50 and L50. N50 is the length of the contigs/scaffolds in which the 50% of the assembly is found in fragments of this length or greater, while L50 is the number of contigs/scaffolds whose length is N50. The higher the value of N50, the lower the value of L50, and vice versa, indicating high continuity in the assembly.

Mammalian genomes

The human and mouse reference genomes are maintained and improved by the Genome Reference Consortium (GRC), a group of fewer than 20 scientists from a number of genome research institutes, including the European Bioinformatics Institute, the National Center for Biotechnology Information, the Sanger Institute and McDonnell Genome Institute at Washington University in St. Louis.  GRC continues to improve reference genomes by building new alignments that contain fewer gaps, and fixing misrepresentations in the sequence.

Human reference genome
The original human reference genome was derived from thirteen anonymous volunteers from Buffalo, New York. Donors were recruited by advertisement in The Buffalo News, on Sunday, March 23, 1997. The first ten male and ten female volunteers were invited to make an appointment with the project's genetic counselors and donate blood from which DNA was extracted. As a result of how the DNA samples were processed, about 80 percent of the reference genome came from eight people and one male, designated RP11, accounts for 66 percent of the total. The ABO blood group system differs among humans, but the human reference genome contains only an O allele, although the others are annotated.

As the cost of DNA sequencing falls, and new full genome sequencing technologies emerge, more genome sequences continue to be generated. In several cases people such as James D. Watson had their genome  assembled using massive parallel DNA sequencing.  Comparison between the reference (assembly NCBI36/hg18) and Watson's genome revealed 3.3  million single nucleotide polymorphism differences, while about 1.4 percent of  his DNA could not be matched to the reference genome at all. For regions where there is known to be large-scale variation, sets of alternate loci are assembled alongside the reference locus.

The latest human reference genome assembly, released by the Genome Reference Consortium, was GRCh38 in 2017. Several patches were added to update it, being the latest the patch GRCh38.p14, published in March 2022. This build only has 349 gaps across all the assembly, which implies a great improvement in comparison with the first version, which had roughly 150,000 gaps. It presents gaps mostly in areas concerning telomeres, centromeres and long repetitive sequences, being the biggest gap along the long arm of the Y chromosome, a region of ~30 Mb length (~52% of the Y chromosome length). The number of genomic clone libraries contributing to the reference has increased steadily to >60 along the years, although individual RP11 still accounts for 70% of the genome. Genomic analysis of this anonymous male suggests that he is of African-European ancestry. In 2022, the Telomere-to-Telomere (T2T) Consortium published the first completely assembled reference genome (version T2T-CHM13), without any gaps in the assembly. The Telomere-to-Telomere (T2T) consortium not only is an open, community-based effort to generate the first complete assembly of a human genome, but also provides an opportunity to examine how peri/centromeric sequences evolve. This effort relied on careful measures in order to assemble, polish, and validate entire peri/centromeric repeat arrays. By deeply characterizing these recently assembled sequences, we present a high-resolution, genome-wide atlas of the sequence content and organization of human peri/centromeric regions. On the other hand, according to the GRC website, their next assembly release for the human genome (version GRCh39) is currently "indefinitely postponed".

Recent genome assemblies are as follows:

Limitations 
For much of a genome, the reference provides a good approximation of the DNA of any single individual. But in regions with high allelic diversity, such as the major histocompatibility complex in humans and the major urinary proteins of mice, the reference genome may differ significantly from other individuals. Due to the fact that the reference genome is a "single" distinct sequence, which gives its utility as an index or locator of genomic features, there are limitations in terms of how faithfully it represents the human genome and its variability. On the other hand, most of the samples used for reference genomes sequencing come from people of european ancestry, being these human populations the best characterized and studied at the expense of non-european populations. In 2010, it was found that, by de novo assembling genomes from african and asian populations with the NCBI reference genome (version NCBI36), these genomes had ~5Mb sequences that did not align against any region of the reference genome.

Following projects to the Human Genome Project seek to address a deeper and more diverse characerization of the human genetic variability, which the reference genome is not able to represent. The HapMap Project, active during the period 2002 -2010, with the purpose of creating a haplotypes map and their most common variations among different human populations. Up to 11 populations of different ancestry were studied, such as individuals of the Han ethnic group from China, Gujaratis from India, the Yoruba people from Nigeria or Japanese people, among others. The 1000 Genomes Project, carried out between 2008 and 2015, with the aim of creating a database that includes more than 95% of the variations present in the human genome and whose results can be used in studies of association with diseases (GWAS) such as diabetes, cardiovascular or autoimmune diseases. A total of 26 ethnic groups were studied in this project, expanding the scope of the HapMap project to new ethnic groups such as the Mende people of Sierra Leone, the Vietnamese people or the Bengali people. The Human Pangenome Project, which started its initial phase in 2019 with the creation of the Human Pangenome Reference Consortium, seeks to create the largest map of human genetic variability taking the results of previous studies as a starting point.

Mouse reference genome 
Recent mouse genome assemblies are as follows:

Other genomes 
Since the Human Genome Project was finished, multiple international projects have started, focused on assembling reference genomes for many organisms. Model organisms (e.g., zebrafish (Danio rerio), chicken (Gallus gallus), Escherichia coli etc.) are of special interest to the scientific community, as well as, for example, endangered species (e.g., Asian arowana (Scleropages formosus) or the American bison (Bison bison)). As of August 2022, the NCBI database supports 71 886 partially or completely sequenced and assembled genomes from different species, such as 676 mammals, 590 birds and 865 fishes. Also noteworthy are the numbers of 1796 insects genomes, 3747 fungi, 1025 plants, 33 724 bacteria, 26 004 virus and 2040 archaea. A lot of these species have annotation data associated with their reference genomes that can be publicly accessed and visualized in genome browsers such as Ensembl and UCSC Genome Browser.

Some examples of these international projects are: the Chimpanzee Genome Project, carried out between 2005 and 2013 jointly by the Broad Institute and the McDonnell Genome Institute of Washington University in St. Louis, which generated the first reference genomes for 4 subspecies of Pan troglodytes; the 100K Pathogen Genome Project, which started in 2012 with the main goal of creating a database of reference genomes for 100 000 pathogen microorganisms to use in public health, outbreaks detection, agriculture and environment; the Earth BioGenome Project, which started in 2018 and aims to sequence and catalog the genomes of all the eukaryotic organisms on Earth to promote biodiversity conservation projects. Inside this big-science project there are up to 50 smaller-scale affiliated projects such as the Africa BioGenome Project or the 1000 Fungal Genomes Project.

References

External links 
Genome Reference Consortium

Genome projects
Genomics
Human genetics
Bioinformatics
DNA sequencing